José Luis Cerón Ayuso (13 November 1924 – 7 June 2009) was a Spanish politician who served as Minister of Trade of Spain in 1975, during the Francoist dictatorship.

References

1924 births
2009 deaths
Economy and finance ministers of Spain
Government ministers during the Francoist dictatorship